William Lowry House, also known as the Kniese-Chaudhuri House, is a historic home located in Posey Township, Fayette County, Indiana.  It was built about 1825, and is a one-story, five bay, L-plan, gable-roofed, Federal style brick cottage.  It has a rear kitchen wing.

It was added to the National Register of Historic Places in 1982.

References

Houses on the National Register of Historic Places in Indiana
Federal architecture in Indiana
Houses completed in 1825
Buildings and structures in Fayette County, Indiana
National Register of Historic Places in Fayette County, Indiana